Adjadja is a village in the commune of Ain Beida, in Sidi Khouiled District, Ouargla Province, Algeria.

References

Neighbouring towns and cities

Populated places in Ouargla Province